Sphagnum fimbriatum, the fringed bogmoss, is a slender Sphagnum moss.

Description
A typical Sphagnum, the fringed bog-moss is all green. The terminal bud on the capitula is easy to see, and the branches are very narrow and long. The stem leaves are very useful for identification as they are wider than they are long and they form a strong collar around the stem. The capsules are brown and look like tiny olives when viewed from above.

Similar species in the British Isles
Sphagnum lindbergii and Sphagnum girgensohnii.

References

fimbriatum